The Ejmiatsin Church is an 18th-century Armenian Apostolic church in the Avlabari district of Old Tbilisi, Georgia. The church is adjacent to the Avlabari Square.

Gallery

See also 
 Church of the Red Gospel, a nearby 18th century Armenian church
 Armenians in Georgia

References

External links 

 Photo of the Ejmiatsin Church

Armenian churches in Tbilisi
Old Tbilisi
Armenian Apostolic churches in Tbilisi